Brodersby is a municipality in the district of Rendsburg-Eckernförde, in Schleswig-Holstein, Germany.

History 
Brodersby and Höxmark were first mentioned in 1268. In 1876 Brodersby became an independent rural municipality of Rendsburg-Eckernförde.

Geography and Transport 
The Ostseebad Schönhagen with a sandy beach and its steep coast is the largest place in the municipality. In addition, Brodersby, Dingelby, Drasberg, Höxmark (Danish:  Høgsmark ), Langacker ( Langager ), Lückeberg and Nübbelfeld ( Nybølmark ) belong to it. The localities Nordhusene and Kikut ( Kikud ) have meanwhile opened up in the Schönhagen district. To the west is the Schwansenstraßefrom Kappeln to Eckernförde, in the south the community extends to Schwansener See.

Politics

Community Council 
Of the nine seats in the municipal council, the CDU had five seats since the local elections in 2003 and the SPD had four.

Of the nine seats in the municipal council, the CDU had six seats since the 2008 local elections and the SPD three.

Of the twelve seats in the municipal council, the CDU has had six seats since the local elections in Schleswig-Holstein on May 26, 2013, the SPD three and the voting community “Democratic Initiative” also has three seats.

Coat of arms 
Blazon: "In gold, a raised, curved blue tip. At the top right a three-leaved green oak branch, at the top left three fanned green ears. At the bottom a silver swan over five silver wavy threads."

Economy 
Agriculture is one of the main industries of Brodersby, in addition to agriculture, tourism is an important source of income, especially in Schönhagen with its spa center and hotels.

Schloss Schönhagen 
Castle Schönhagen was created in 1711 near a farm in Höxmark. The eponymous manor district existed until 1928.

Built in 1889 by the Hanseatic Nobleman Hermann Jauch, it was used as his primary residence until his death, today the castle is used as a rehabilitation clinic.

Pictures

External links 

 Municipality of Brodersby at the office of Schlei-Ostsee
 Touristinformation Schönhagen

References

Municipalities in Schleswig-Holstein
Rendsburg-Eckernförde